Albinospila floresaria is a species of moth of the family Geometridae first described by Francis Walker in 1866. It is found in the north-eastern Himalayas, as well as on Sumatra, Borneo, Java, Bali, the Philippines, Sulawesi and the Lesser Sundas and in Australia (including Queensland).

Adults are apple green with dark red discal spots and margins and a white forewing costa. The postmedial lines are white.

References

Moths described in 1854
Hemitheini
Moths of Asia
Moths of Australia